Idaho Proposition 2 was a 2006 ballot initiative in the state of Idaho, U.S. that aimed to force government to reimburse property owners whose property value is decreased as a result of government regulation.

The initiative, which is similar to the controversial Oregon Ballot Measure 37 (2004), was defeated.

Text
The long title of the proposition states:
AN INITIATIVE RELATING TO EMINENT DOMAIN; AMENDING SECTION 7­ 701, IDAHO CODE, TO PROVIDE LIMITATIONS ON EMINENT DOMAIN FOR PRIVATE PARTIES, AND FOR URBAN RENEWAL OR ECONOMIC DEVELOPMENT PURPOSES; AND PROVIDE FOR FURTHER JUDICIAL REVIEW OF PROCEEDINGS INVOLVING THE EXERCISE OF EMINENT DOMAIN; ADDING A NEW SECTION 7-701A TO PROVIDE FOR DEFINITIONS RELATING TO HIGHEST AND BEST USE, FAIR MARKET VALUE, JUST COMPENSATION, AND LAND USE LAW; AND AMENDING CHAPTER 80, TITLE 67, IDAHO CODE, TO PROVIDE FOR JUST COMPENSATION WHEN A REGULATORY ACTION REDUCES FAIR MARKET VALUE OF PROPERTY AND TO PROVIDE JUST COMPENSATION TO A CONDEMNEE.

Result by county

Source: Idaho Secretary of State

External links
Full text of the amendment

References

 

2006 Idaho elections
2006 ballot measures
Idaho ballot measures